Richard Cleveland may refer to:

Richard Falley Cleveland (1804–1853), grandfather of the below, father of Grover Cleveland, president of the United States
Richard F. Cleveland (1897–1974), grandson of the above, son of Grover Cleveland, president of the United States